Salug, officially the Municipality of Salug (Subanen: Benwa Salog; Chavacano: Municipalidad de Salug), is a 3rd class municipality in the province of Zamboanga del Norte, Philippines. As of the 2020 census, it had a population of 32,134 people.

History

It could be said without fear of contradiction that most names of the Municipality of Zamboanga del Norte including the province itself derived from the earliest settlers, the Subanon tribes.

In the earlier part of the history of Sindangan, there were two barrios: Labason and Liloy.  Salug then was a mere sitio of the rustic village of Liloy. Legend has it then an adventurous young man from the village of Liloy, on reaching a certain river, was affronted the problem of crossing as there were no signs of available means to ferry him to the other side. While engrossed with this problem, a Subanon coming from nowhere he knew, made a sign asking him if he wish to cross the river.  In return, he asked the almost naked Subano man the name of the place.  The Subano man thinking he was being asked if there may be a possibility of crossing the river, answered "Salog", a Subanon terminology meaning that the current of the river was very strong.

In his departure, the Christian carried into his memory "Salug" is the name of the place beyond the other side of the river he wanted to cross.  Thus Salug become a popular name until it was officially declared so upon its creation into a municipality.

By virtue of Republic Act 2310 dated June 21, 1979, the Municipality of Salug was created; however, Araw ng Salug (Salug Day) is annually celebrated on the 18th day of September,

Mayors' protest
On December 28, 2007, Salug Mayor Jesus Lim, president of the Zamboanga del Norte Mayors’ League, led 20 mayors of Zamboanga del Norte who protested the Department of Justice's incarceration of former congressman Romeo Jalosjos. Flags in their respective towns were flown at half mast and black ribbons were displayed at town halls.

Geography
Municipality of Salug is bounded on the south by the municipality of Godod the north-west by Liloy, to the east by the municipality of Leon B. Postigo, and to the north by Sindangan Bay.

Climate

Salug falls within the third type of climate wherein the seasons are not very pronounced. Rain is more or less evenly distributed throughout the year. Because of its tropical location the municipality does not experience cold weather. Neither does it experience strong weather disturbances due to its geographical location (being outside the typhoon belt) and also because of the mountains that are surrounding the municipality.

Barangays
Salug is politically subdivided into 23 barangays.

Demographics

Salug Municipality is predominantly Christian with Philippine Independent Church or Aglipayan and Roman Catholics constitutes the majority of the Christians. Salugnon is composed of Visayan speaking locals and the minorities that compose of the lumad or aborigine Subanon tribe.

Language
Cebuano and Subanon are majority spoken languages.  The majority of the population can speak and understand English.

Tourism

Economy

Transportation

The Integrated Bus Terminal, located at the center of the municipality, serves short- and long-distance trips connecting other municipalities, cities in Zamboanga del Norte and neighboring provinces. The public modes of transportation within the municipality are sikad-sikad and habal-habal and pedicabs. Jeepneys, van, and bus Rural Transits are available for long-distance travels.

Seaport

The Port of Liloy is located 30 minutes away from the Municipality of Salug facing the Sindangan Bay It serves the cargo port for transporting products to and from Zamboanga City, Sindangan and Cebu.

Airports

The main airport is Dipolog Airport, located in the City of Dipolog, a -hour drive from the Poblacion. There is also a neighboring community airport in Liloy but it serves only private and government aircraft for official visits in the adjacent areas.

Government

Elected officials
Members of the municipal council (2019–2022):

Municipal officials (2016-2019):
 Mayor: Jeffrey T. Lim 
 Vice Mayor: William D. Maribojoc
Councilors:
 Jonathan R. Balucos
 Rebecca L. Baguio
 Mercedario N. Pamil
 Gerardo T. Literatus
 Allan D. Saldia
 Salatiel S. Dialo
 Oscar M. Acas
 Edgar A. Sultan
 Cerelino Mercado - ABC President

References

External links
 Salug Profile at PhilAtlas.com
 [ Philippine Standard Geographic Code]
Philippine Census Information

Municipalities of Zamboanga del Norte